Dieter Braun (born 2 February 1943 in Ulm, Bavaria) is a former road racer of Grand Prix solo motorcycles from Germany. He won the 1970 FIM 125cc World Championship for Suzuki. In 1973, he rode a Yamaha TZ 250 to the 250 cc FIM world championship.

Braun's victory at the 1970 Isle of Man TT was notable because he was one of only seven riders to have won an Isle of Man TT race in their first attempt. Due to the circuit's 37.7 mile length, it usually takes competitors two or three attempts before they learn its nuances. He is also known for an incident that occurred immediately after he won the East German Grand Prix in the 1971 season. As the West German national anthem was being played during the winner's ceremony, the East German crowd began singing the words to the anthem. The East German government reacted by making the following year's East German Grand Prix an invitation only race, and in 1973, the race was stricken from the Grand Prix calendar.

He also raced in cars, entering five races with Team Warsteiner Eurorace in the 1975 European Formula Two Championship (effectively starting the race on four of that occasions).

Braun's career ended after a serious accident at the 1977 350cc Austrian Grand Prix at the Salzburgring.

Grand Prix motorcycle racing results 
Points system from 1950 to 1968:

Points system from 1969 onwards:

(key) (Races in bold indicate pole position; races in italics indicate fastest lap)

Literature 
 
 Rönicke, Frank: Deutsche Motorrad-Welt- und Europameister - von Schorsch Meier bis Stefan Bradl. 1. Auflage, Motorbuch-Verlag, Stuttgart 2012, p. 136–141

References 

German motorcycle racers
125cc World Championship riders
250cc World Championship riders
350cc World Championship riders
500cc World Championship riders
Isle of Man TT riders
Sportspeople from Ulm
1943 births
Living people
250cc World Riders' Champions
125cc World Riders' Champions